Philippe Bérot (born 29 January 1965 in Tarbes) is a former French rugby union player and a current coach. He played as a fullback and as a wing.

Bérot first youth team was Lannemezan, from 1980/81 to 1982/83, moving to SU Agen in 1983/84, where he would play until 1991/92. He won the French Championship in 1987/88, was runners-up in 1983/84, 1985/86 and 1989/90, and won the Cup of France in 1991/92. He moved afterwards to FC Auch Gers, where he played from 1992/93 to 1999/2000. He finished his player career aged 35 years old.

He had 19 caps for France, from 1986 to 1989, still scoring 3 tries, 24 conversions and 33 penalties, 159 points on aggregate. He played and was a three times winner at the Five Nations Championship, in 1987, with a Grand Slam, being the top scorer, with 37 points, in 1988, ex-aequo with Wales, and in 1989, once again with a Grand Slam. He scored an aggregate of 1 try, 7 conversions and 13 penalties, 57 points, in the three presences at the competition. Despite this he wasn't called for the 1987 Rugby World Cup.

Bérot started a coach career, after ending his player career, being in charge of FC Auch, from 2000/01 to 2001/02, of the centres of Castres Olympique, from 2002/03 to 2005/06, Stade Montois, in 2006/07, and Tarbes Pyrénées Rugby, from February 2008 to 2011/12.

On 19 May 2012, he became an assistant coach for the Italian national side, coaching the backs and working the defence, under head coach Jacques Brunel.

References

External links 
 Philippe Bérot International Statistics

1965 births
Living people
Sportspeople from Tarbes
French rugby union players
France international rugby union players
French rugby union coaches
Rugby union fullbacks
Rugby union wings